Area codes 631 and 934 are the telephone area codes in the North American Numbering Plan (NANP) for Suffolk County, New York, on Long Island. Area code 631 was created in 1999 in a split from 516; and 934 was added as an overlay in 2016. Communities within the area include Babylon, Huntington, Islip, Smithtown, Brookhaven, Riverhead, Southampton, Southold, Shelter Island, and East Hampton.

History of Suffolk County area codes

1947–1951: 914
With the announcement of a new nationwide telephone numbering plan by the American Telephone and Telegraph Company (AT&T) in October 1947, Suffolk County, Nassau County, the lower Hudson Valley, and some areas adjacent were assigned area code 914.

1951–1999: 516
During 1951, area code 516 was assigned to Suffolk and Nassau, which were separated thereby from area code 914.

1999–2016: 631
On November 1, 1999, area code 631 was created solely for Suffolk County, to satisfy the increased need for telephone numbers mainly due to cellular services, while Nassau County retained area code 516.  Permissive dialing for numbers in 516 across Long Island continued until the spring of 2000.

2016–present: 934 overlay
On July 16, 2016, area code 934 was created to overlay 631, which was nearing depletion. This was the first overlay area code for an area in the state of New York outside New York City and required 10-digit dialing for both area codes, effective June 18, 2016.

See also
 List of NANP area codes
 List of New York area codes

References

External links

631
631